Robin Maulun (born 23 November 1996) is a French professional footballer who plays as an attacking midfielder for SC Cambuur.

Club career
Maulun made his first-team debut for Bordeaux on 30 July 2015, being introduced in the 84nd minute of his club's first leg match against Cypriot side AEK Larnaca in the third qualifying round for the Europa League before making his full debut in the second leg on 6 August 2015. On 14 May 2016, he debuted in Ligue 1 being brought onto the pitch in the 39th minute for the injured Pablo. He extended his contract with Cambuur until 2023 in January 2021.

References

External links
 
 
 
 

Living people
1996 births
French footballers
Association football midfielders
France youth international footballers
Ligue 1 players
Championnat National 2 players
Championnat National 3 players
Eredivisie players
Eerste Divisie players
FC Girondins de Bordeaux players
Trélissac FC players
SC Cambuur players
French expatriate footballers
French expatriate sportspeople in the Netherlands
Expatriate footballers in the Netherlands